Smythe's Green is a hamlet on the B1022 road, in the Colchester district, in the county of Essex, England. It is located in between the villages of Tiptree and Birch.

Hamlets in Essex